The 2014–15 San Diego Sockers season was the sixth season of the San Diego Sockers professional indoor soccer club. The San Diego Sockers, a Pacific Division team in the Major Arena Soccer League, played their home games in the Valley View Casino Center in San Diego, California.

The team was led by general manager John Kentera and head coach Phil Salvagio with assistant coach Ray Taila. Amassing a 16–4 regular season record, the Sockers qualified for the playoffs as the top seed in the Pacific Division but lost to the Las Vegas Legends in the Pacific Division Final.

Season summary
The Sockers started the season with a four-game winning streak before a road loss to the Las Vegas Legends. The team won the next two at home then lost back to back games in Missouri. Unlike in recent seasons, a substantial portion of the Sockers roster was born outside the United States. As of January 2015, the team included 7 international players, including 3 from Brazil, 2 from Spain, and 1 each from Mexico and Argentina. The Sockers then won their next 9 games, home and road, before losing on the road at Las Vegas for the second time this season. The Sockers closed out the season with a home win against the Ontario Fury, finishing with a 16–4 record and the top seed in the Pacific Division for the playoffs. They lost 6–7 to the Las Vegas Legends in the Pacific Division Final.

History
This is the third professional soccer franchise to use the "San Diego Sockers" name. The original Sockers were founded in 1978 and played in the NASL, original MISL, and the CISL before ceasing operations in 1996. The second Sockers were briefly revived for the WISL in 2001 and transitioned to the second MISL in 2002 before folding in 2004.

The current Sockers were founded in 2009 and played their first three PASL seasons at the Chevrolet Del Mar Arena in Del Mar, California, before moving to Valley View Casino Center before the 2012–13 season. After early struggles, the team dominated the PASL for several years with long winning streaks and consecutive championships. The Sockers finished the 2013–14 regular season 2nd in the Pacific Division with a 13–3 record, qualifying for the post-season but losing to the Las Vegas Legends in the Division Final.

Off-field moves
In May 2014, the Professional Arena Soccer League added six teams from the failed third incarnation of the Major Indoor Soccer League and reorganized as the Major Arena Soccer League. With the league expansion and reorganization, the other Pacific teams for 2014–15 are California-based Ontario Fury, Sacramento Surge, and Turlock Express plus the Las Vegas Legends and the expansion Seattle Impact. The Impact's assets were purchased mid-season and the team replaced on the schedule by the Tacoma Stars.

Schedule

Pre-season

Regular season

 Seattle Impact shut down mid-season; franchise purchased by Tacoma Stars
 Originally scheduled for February 15; rescheduled to avoid an arena conflict.

Post-season

Awards and honors
San Diego forward Kraig Chiles was selected for the 2014-15 MASL All-League First Team. Defender Eduardo Velez was selected for the All-League Second Team. Goalkeeper Chris Toth and forward Nick Perera were selected for the All-League Third Team. San Diego midfielder Ney Almeida was named to the league's all-rookie team for 2014–15.

On March 13, the MASL announced the finalists for its major year-end awards. These nominees included San Diego forward Kraig Chiles for Most Valuable Player and Chris Toth for Goalkeeper of the Year.

References

External links
San Diego Sockers official website
San Diego Sockers at U-T San Diego

San Diego Sockers seasons
San Diego Sockers
San Diego Sockers 2014
San Diego Sockers 2014